Karl Marenius Ivarsson (7 July 1867 – 10 December 1922) was a Norwegian schoolteacher, school administrator and politician.

He was born in Trondenes to fisherman Mathias Olai Iversen and Anne Kirstine Markussen. He was elected representative to the Storting for the period 1919–1921, for the Liberal Party. He served as mayor of Vardø from 1913 to 1916.

References

1867 births
1922 deaths
People from Harstad
Norwegian schoolteachers
Liberal Party (Norway) politicians
Members of the Storting
Mayors of places in Finnmark
Mayors of Harstad